The 2009 European Track Championships were the European Championship for track cycling, for junior and under 23 riders. They took place in Minsk, Belarus from 15 July to 19 July 2009.

2009 was the final year this event was held for junior and under-23 riders. Following a widescale redesign of European track cycling by the UEC, an event under the same name, but for elite cyclists, was held from 2010. In addition, a new competition, explicitly named the European Track Championships for under-23 and Juniors, was held from 2010 in a separate event.

Medal summary

Under 23

Junior

Medal Table

2009 European Track Championships in Belgium

The men's and women's omnium took place at 17 and 18 October in Belgium.

Results

Omnium sprint

References

European Track Championships, 2009
European Track Championships
European Track Championships, 2009
Cycle races in Belarus
International sports competitions hosted by Belarus
 
Sports competitions in Minsk